Lukman Alade Fakeye (born June 25, 1983, in Ibadan) is a Yoruba Nigerian sculptor and woodcarver. The youngest in the Fakeye family of carvers, he is a nephew of Lamidi Olonade Fakeye, who carved the doors of the African Room at the Kennedy Center in Washington, D. C. Lukman began working with his father, Akin Fakeye, at the age of nine.

Lukman Alade Fakeye studied art and design at The Polytechnic, Ibadan, where he was elected Best Student in Sculpture twice. Fakeye's works can be seen in public and private collections in Nigeria, the United States, and the United Kingdom.

Exhibitions

The student art gallery at Ibadan Polytechnic
Osun Oshogbo Annual Festival with Wale Adelakun, 2000, and with Akindele Olufemi Olunloyo, 2006
Aafak Art Gallery, Lagos, Nigeria, with Awotunde Adeniyi, 2002
Megamurth Impression Art Gallery with Seun Adeyemo
Africraft Art Gallery with Rotimi Aderogba, 2005
Dutch Embassy in Abuja, 2001
Mansah Gallery, Banjul, The Gambia, 2007

Notes

External links
 Grains of Africa: Fakeye & Yoruba Art
 FolkCuba: Fakeye Family Yoruba Traditional Arts
 Lamidi Fakeye

References
Lamidi Olonade Fakeye. Lamidi Olonade Fakeye: A Retrospective Exhibition and Autobiography, My Life and Art. 1997.

Nigerian woodcarvers
Nigerian sculptors
1983 births
Living people
Yoruba artists
People from Ibadan